The Visual Bible: Matthew is a 1993 film portraying the life of Jesus as it is found in the Gospel of Matthew. The complete Gospel is presented word-for-word based on the New International Version of the Bible.  It was directed by South African film maker Regardt van den Bergh and stars veteran actor Richard Kiley in the role of St. Matthew (who narrates the movie), newcomer Bruce Marchiano as Jesus, and Gerrit Schoonhoven as Peter. Marchiano portrays Jesus as a joyous, earthy, personal man with a sense of humour.

The film has been dubbed into various foreign languages including Spanish, Cantonese and Mandarin Chinese.

Plot
In Israel, then known as Judea (Roman province) of the Roman Empire, Jesus Christ of Nazareth travels around the country with His disciples preaching to the people about God and salvation of their souls. As prophesied in the Old Testament books, he was born of the virgin, Mary. He performed great miracles while spreading the gospel of hope and peace as the son of God and the Messiah who can save men from eternal death if they believed in Him. He is then arrested by the Romans and crucified. He rises from the dead after three days.

Cast
 Richard Kiley as Old Matthew
 Bruce Marchiano as Jesus Christ
 Joanna Weinberg as Mary (mother of Jesus)
 Tony Caprari as Joseph
 Marcel van Heerden as John the Baptist
 Gerrit Schoonhoven as Peter
 Hannes Muller as Andrew
 Charlton George as James, son of Zebedee
 Kevin Smith as John
 Ivan D. Lucas as Phillip
 Jaques De Klerk as Bartholomew
 Sean Cameron Michael as Thomas
 Matthew Dylan Roberts as Young Matthew
 Tony Joubert as James, son of Alphaeus
 Jonathan Pienaar as Thaddaeus
 Darryl Fuchs as Simon the Zealot
 Dawid Minnaar as Judas Iscariot
 Gordon van Rooyen as Caiaphas
 Brian O'Shaughnessy as Pontius Pilate
 Patrick Mynhardt as Herod the Great
 Chris Truter as Herod Antipas
 Pippa Duffy as Mary Magdalene
 Dominique Newman as the Young Woman
 David Müller as the Pharisee
 Dawie Maritz
 DeWet Van Rooyen
 Denise Newman
 Goliath Davids
 Keith Grenville
 Maria Zak and Sasha Zak	 as the Children of Babylon

See also
The Visual Bible: John
The Visual Bible: Acts
Visual Bible

References

External links 
 
 Positive review at Movie Guide.com
 Matthew website

1993 films
1993 drama films
English-language South African films
Gospel of Matthew
Films about Jesus
Film portrayals of Jesus' death and resurrection
Portrayals of the Virgin Mary in film
Portrayals of Saint Joseph in film
Portrayals of Mary Magdalene in film
Cultural depictions of Saint Peter
Cultural depictions of Pontius Pilate
Cultural depictions of John the Baptist
Cultural depictions of Herod the Great
Films directed by Regardt van den Bergh
1990s English-language films